Joff Ellen (born Raymond Charles Ellen; 20 May 191524 December 1999), was an Australian entertainer, actor and comedian.

Career
During World War II he performed vaudeville acts to the troops and after the war did comedy shows on Melbourne radio station 3XY 1422, now known as Radio Hellas

He appeared in various children's television shows as the character Joffa Boy, particularly The Tarax Show, wearing a Carlton Football Club jumper and "Bombay Bloomers" with large suspenders that he would manipulate for comic effect.   His entrance song (written by resident star ventriloquist Ron Blaskett) was recorded by the show's girls choir along with musical director Margot Sheridan, and went like this:Choir: "Who is that peeping round the corner?
 It's not Jack Spratt or Little Johnny Horner."
 *(Joffa then peers around the corner of the set entrance and sings the next line)*
 "I'm the chap who always has a grin"
 Choir: "Joffa Boy! Joffa Boy! Please come in."
He would then greet the audience with "Howdy Doody, boys and girls!", and they would respond "Howdy Doody, Joffa Boy!". In addition, he developed a humorous audience greeting which became his catch-cry, "Howdy-doody, boys and girls and mums and dads and bald-headed babies".

Ellen also played the naughty schoolboy role of "Conkers" in the slapstick series Take That for Crawford Productions, which reputedly could have been Australia's first TV sitcom. 

His only known film role was in Nightclub (1952), one of only a handful of films made in Melbourne in that decade, where he appeared with the artist and actor Valma Howell whom he was briefly engaged to before she died in a car crash.

He was nationally famous for his appearances with Graham Kennedy on the television show In Melbourne Tonight and later The Graham Kennedy Show from 1958 to 1974 employing a variety mix of song-and-dance, comedy sketches and other vaudevillean skills.

Personal life
He retired in 1976 and lived in Tarwin Lower, Victoria with his wife, Bernadette. The couple were married for 54 years.

References

1915 births
1999 deaths
Australian male comedians
Australian male film actors
Male actors from Victoria (Australia)
20th-century Australian male actors
20th-century Australian comedians